Letňany is an area of Prague, Czech Republic. It was founded in 1307, and became part of Prague in 1968. It has been part of the Prague 9 administrative district since 2001, having previously been in the local government district of Prague 18, and it has its own cadastral area (also called "Prague 18"). It has become one of the richest districts in Prague.

There is a large shopping mall, "Obchodní centrum Letňany", which has a shopping area in excess of 125,000 m2.

Letňany was the site of the aircraft industry (Avia and Letov), but as the industry gradually declined Letňany became a mostly residential district. There are two airports – the non-public international Letňany airport and Kbely military airport.

Nearby Letňany metro station opened in May 2008, on the new extension of Line C on the Prague Metro.

Government
The Air Accidents Investigation Institute has its head office in Letňany.

Concerts 
The place has also been used as the venue for some big concerts, including AC/DC, Ed Sheeran, Rolling Stones, or Guns N' Roses, and Metallica, Rammstein and more.

References

External links

 The official Letnany website — in Czech
 The official Letnany Airport website — in Czech

1307 establishments in Europe
Populated places established in the 1300s
Districts of Prague